Barack Obama, the 44th president of the United States, addressed a joint session of the United States Congress on Tuesday, February 24, 2009. It was his first public address before a joint session. Similar to a State of the Union Address, it was delivered before the 111th United States Congress in the Chamber of the United States House of Representatives in the United States Capitol. Presiding over this joint session was the Speaker of the United States House of Representatives, Nancy Pelosi, accompanied by Joe Biden, the vice president in his capacity as the president of the Senate.

During his speech, President Obama discussed the recently passed $787 billion American Recovery and Reinvestment Act of 2009 as well as the Troubled Assets Relief Program, the state of the economy, and the future of the country.

Attorney General Eric Holder was the designated survivor and did not attend the address in order to maintain a continuity of government. He was sequestered at a secret secure location for the duration of the event.

Republican response

Louisiana Governor Bobby Jindal delivered the Republican response to the address, calling Obama's stimulus plan irresponsible. Jindal's response received criticism from both Democrats and Republicans.

See also
First 100 days of Barack Obama's presidency
List of joint sessions of the United States Congress

References

External links

2009 Address of Barack Obama at State of the Union Address Library

Louisiana Governor Bobby Jindal Delivers Presidential Economic Response (video) on C-SPAN
Louisiana Governor Bobby Jindal Delivers Presidential Economic Response (transcript)

111th United States Congress
2009 in American politics
2009 in Washington, D.C.
2009 in the United States
2009 speeches
February 2009 events in the United States
Presidency of Barack Obama
Speeches by Barack Obama
Joint sessions of the United States Congress
Obama speech to joint session of Congress, 2009-02
Articles containing video clips